Stony Bottom is an unincorporated community located in Pocahontas County, West Virginia, United States. In the early 19th century, the town was known as Seldom Seen. At some point, this was changed to Driftwood by loggers who would drift logs by on the Greenbrier River. By 1908, it took its present name because of all the stones and rocks present in the area.  The town currently has seasonal residents, as well as full-time residents and a small church named Alexander Memorial Presbyterian Church.  On Labor Day of every year, the small town accommodates hundreds of people for the annual Hunter Reunion, where local resident Homer Hunter invites the community to take part in traditional bluegrass music, food, and fellowship.  The town is nestled between the Greenbrier River and the Greenbrier River Trail, suitable for biking, horseback riding, and more. Their Post Office  has been closed.

References 

Unincorporated communities in Pocahontas County, West Virginia
Unincorporated communities in West Virginia